PP-29 (Sargodha-II) was a Constituency of Provincial Assembly of Punjab. After 2018 Delimitations it was abolished because Sargodha District lost 1 constituency after 2017 Census

General elections 2013

General elections 2008

See also

 Punjab, Pakistan

References

External links
 Election commission Pakistan's official website
 Awazoday.com check result
 Official Website of Government of Punjab

Provincial constituencies of Punjab, Pakistan